Off the Air is an American anthology television series that airs on Adult Swim. Every episode is composed of surreal videos of different media and purposes – animated and live-action short films, clips from feature films and other television series, stock videos, music videos, abstract loops – presented continuously and in succession. These videos are arranged around a single vague theme, as expressed in the episode's title, and are accompanied by songs by various artists. Dave Hughes, the creator of the series, also serves as its editor. He and the rest of the series' producers also commission artists to produce works to be featured in an episode.

Forty-two episodes have aired over eleven seasons since Off the Air premiered on January 1, 2011. Every episode had a time slot of 4 a.m., which has contributed to the series' obscurity and status among fans of Adult Swim. Three special episodes have been produced: "Dan Deacon: U.S.A.", "Seramthgin", and "Dan Deacon: When I Was Done Dying". The twentieth episode "NEWNOW" is a celebration of New Year's Day and the series' fifth anniversary featuring six original songs.

Series overview

Episodes
The closing credits of every episode list the featured videos and songs as well as their respective artists; generic stock footage is often employed, and suppliers (including Corbis, Getty Images, and iStock) are additionally credited. In the following lists, material commissioned for an episode are marked with a dagger. Segments are shown in an episode with more than one excerpt and so are marked with a plus (+) and the number of the segment that has been previously shown earlier in an episode.

Season 1 (2011–12)

Season 2 (2012–13)

Season 3 (2013–14)

Season 4 (2014–15)

Season 5 (2015)

Season 6 (2016–17)

Season 7 (2017)

Season 8 (2018–19)

Season 9 (2019)

Season 10 (2020)

Season 11 (2021)

Season 12 (2022)

Specials

References

External links
 
 Official livestream from Adult Swim
 

Lists of American adult animated television series episodes
Lists of American comedy television series episodes
Lists of anthology television series episodes